Daniel Valerio (21 April 1988 – 8 September 1990) was an Australian boy who was beaten to death on 8 September 1990 by Paul Aiton, his mother's boyfriend at the time. His death caused outrage amongst the public and led to the introduction of mandatory reporting of suspected child abuse in Victoria.

Aiton was convicted of murder charges and sentenced to 22 years in prison, eligible for parole in 2011.

References

External links 
 Daniel Valerio at Find a Grave

1990 in Australia
September 1990 events in Australia
1990 murders in Australia
Deaths by person in Australia
Incidents of violence against boys
Murder in Victoria (Australia)